This is a list of Japan Airlines destinations.

Map

Destinations

References

Lists of airline destinations
Oneworld destinations
Japan Airlines